Luishi Airport  is an airport serving the village of Luishi in Katanga Province, Democratic Republic of the Congo.

See also

Transport in the Democratic Republic of the Congo
List of airports in the Democratic Republic of the Congo

References

External links
 OpenStreetMap - Luishi

Airports in Haut-Katanga Province